Kurtis Drummond (born January 29, 1992) is a former American football safety. He played college football at Michigan State.

High school career
Drummond attended Hubbard High School in Hubbard, Ohio.

Considered a three-star recruit by ESPN.com, Drummond was listed as the No. 84 athlete in the nation in 2010. He committed to play college football at Michigan State University in October 2009.

College career
Drummond was redshirted as a freshman in 2010 after tearing his labrum. Drummond played in 12 games as a backup to Trenton Robinson as a redshirt freshman in 2011. He finished the season with 17 tackles and two interceptions. As a sophomore in 2012 Drummond played in 12 games with seven starts. He recorded 53 tackles and two interceptions. Drummond was a first-team All-Big Ten selection as a junior in 2013 after recording 91 tackles and four interceptions. He again was first-team All-Big Ten as a senior after recording 72 tackles and four interceptions. He was also named a first-team All-American by the Football Writers Association of America (FWAA).

Professional career

Houston Texans 
Drummond was signed by the Houston Texans as an undrafted free agent on May 8, 2015. He was waived on September 5, 2017 and was re-signed to the practice squad. He was promoted to the active roster on October 27, 2015. He appeared in 9 games and made 14 tackles, primarily playing on special teams.

On August 30, 2016, Drummond was placed on injured reserve.

On October 4, 2017, Drummond was waived by the Texans and was re-signed to the practice squad. He was promoted back to the active roster on October 14, 2017.

On September 2, 2018, Drummond was waived by the Texans.

San Antonio Commanders (AAF)
On January 4, 2019, Drummond signed with the San Antonio Commanders of the AAF. The league ceased operations in April 2019.

In 2019, Drummond was drafted by the Dallas Renegades of the XFL in the second round of his position group in the 2020 XFL Draft.

References

External links
Michigan State Spartans bio

1992 births
Living people
People from Trumbull County, Ohio
Players of American football from Ohio
American football safeties
Michigan State Spartans football players
Houston Texans players
San Antonio Commanders players